Comparison of software for processing NMR spectra.

Nuclear magnetic resonance software
Nuclear magnetic resonance software